LaSalle/Van Buren  is a Chicago "L" station in downtown Chicago serving the CTA's Brown, Orange, Pink, and Purple Lines. LaSalle/Van Buren is one of the eight stations in the Loop. The station opened on October 3, 1897. LaSalle Street Station, terminal for Metra's Rock Island District trains, is less than a block from the station.

The station is seen in the 1986 film Running Scared with Gregory Hines and Billy Crystal. All of the surroundings, including the platforms and the station, are still the same now as they are in the movie.  The station was also a location in one of the final scenes of the 1987 film Planes, Trains and Automobiles with Steve Martin and John Candy. The station is also seen in the 1974 film Three the Hard Way.

The Chicago Board of Trade Building is one block to the north.

Bus connections
CTA
22 Clark (Owl Service)
24 Wentworth (Weekday Rush Hours only)
36 Broadway
130 Museum Campus (Memorial Day-Labor Day Only)

References

External links 
LaSalle/Van Buren Station Page

LaSalle Street entrance from Google Maps Street View
Clark Street entrance from Google Maps Street View

CTA Brown Line stations
CTA Orange Line stations
CTA Pink Line stations
CTA Purple Line stations
Railway stations in the United States opened in 1897
Former North Shore Line stations